BiellaForum is an indoor sporting arena located in Biella, Italy. The capacity of the arena is for 5,707 people and was opened in February 2009. It is currently home only of the Pallacanestro Biella basketball team.

See also
 List of indoor arenas in Italy

References

Indoor arenas in Italy
Basketball venues in Italy